This article displays the rosters for the teams competing at the EuroBasket Women 2019. Each team had to submit 12 players.

Group A

Great Britain
A 17-player squad was announced on 18 May 2019. The final squad was revealed on 19 June 2019.

|}
| valign="top" |
 Head coach

 Assistant coaches

Legend
Club – describes lastclub before the tournament
Age – describes ageon 27 June 2019
|}

Latvia
A 16-player squad was announced on 16 May 2019. The final squad was revealed on 22 June 2019.

Spain
The squad was announced on 17 June 2019.

}

Ukraine
A 19-player squad was announced on 5 May 2019. The final squad was revealed on 24 June 2019.

Group B

Czech Republic
A 17-player squad was announced on 6 May 2019. The final squad was revealed on 19 June 2019.

France
The squad was announced on 16 June 2019.

Montenegro
A 21-player squad was announced on 3 May 2019. The final squad was revealed on 24 June 2019.

Sweden
The squad was announced on 16 June 2019.

|}
| valign="top" |
 Head coach

 Assistant coaches

Legend
Club – describes lastclub before the tournament
Age – describes ageon 27 June 2019
|}

Group C

Hungary
A 18-player squad was announced on 25 April 2019. The final squad was revealed on 23 June 2019.

Italy
A 17-player squad was announced on 15 May 2019. The final squad was revealed on 24 June 2019.

Slovenia
The squad was announced on 17 June 2019.

}

Turkey
A 21-player squad was announced on 9 May 2019. The final squad was revealed on 25 June 2019.

Group D

Belarus
A 16-player squad was announced on 11 May 2019.

Belgium
The squad was announced on 17 June 2019.

Russia
The final squad was announced on 24 June 2019.

Serbia
A 19-player squad was announced on 15 May 2019.

References

External links
Official website

Squads
EuroBasket Women squads